Usheri or Usherayi is a mountain pass in Upper Dir, Khyber Pakhtunkhwa, Pakistan. It is located at a distance of 25 km from the main town of Darora.

See also
 Khyber Pass
Kumrat Valley
Laram Top

Mountain passes of the Hindu Kush
Mountain passes of Khyber Pakhtunkhwa
Upper Dir District
Tourist attractions in Khyber Pakhtunkhwa
Tourism in Khyber Pakhtunkhwa
Populated places in Upper Dir District